Cuan Mhuire (Irish for "Mary's Harbour") is a charitable drug, alcohol and gambling rehabilitation organisation in Ireland. Cuan Mhuire offers a comprehensive, structured, abstinence based, residential programme to persons suffering from alcohol, other chemical dependencies and gambling. Cuan Mhuire was founded by Sr. Consilio Fitzgerald a member of the Sisters of Mercy in 1966. Cuan Mhuire has its own programme, developed by Sr. Consilio and her staff over a period of 40 years. Cuan Mhuire has rehabilitation centres and other facilities all over Ireland both north and south dealing with approximately 2500 people each year.

History and development
Cuan Mhuire was founded by Sr. Consilio in 1966. Sr. Consilio had qualified as a nurse and a midwife and had been stationed in St. Vincent's Hospital in Athy, County Kildare.

Sr. Consilio first real interaction with alcoholics was when she worked in St. Vincent's. She realised that her true calling was to help the people who were marginalised and considered 'untouchables' and to show them that a rebirth was possible.

Dairy
In 1965 Sr. Consilio convinced the nuns in Athy to convert the dairy of the convent into a 'drop in' centre, where she could greet her visitors and listen to their troubles. This dairy became the focal point of Sr. Consilio's work with the homeless and the addicts. By this time, a few tradesmen had begun to recover from their addiction and they set to work on the dairy. Thus a functioning unit began. As the building was being reconstructed, so too were peoples lives being reconstructed.

In the early days, the dairy became known as the 'dug out', so Sr. Consilio felt she must give it a proper name. Her friend, Dr. Des O'Neill who was a constant help in the
development of Cuan Mhuire, suggested the name "An Cuan" meaning "The Harbour". Sr Consilio felt that it would have to include Our Lady's name and said  none of this would have been possible without her– hence the name "Cuan Mhuire".

First purpose-built rehabilitation center
In November 1972, a farm of land came up for sale just outside Athy. Sr. Consilio, encouraged by the support of her Mother superior, paid a visit to the local bank manager. He asked Sr. Consilio how she would pay for it. She told him that "Our Lady would provide". Sr. Consilio attended the auction in full nun regalia and she came away from the auction with a forty two acre field and no way to pay for it.
The bank manager later discovered that Sr. Consilio had paid off the purchase price in full and he had not to worry about honouring the big cheque. When he asked Sr. Consilio how she managed to pay for the land, she simply replied: "Our Lady helped me".

Programme 
The mission statement of Cuan Mhuire is:
To provide a context in which persons who feel rejected or dejected because of their addictions, become aware of, and learn to deal with, the underlying problems related to those addictions, and discover their uniqueness, giftedness and the real purpose in life.

Cuan Mhuire is inspired by the belief "that every human being is made to the image and likeness of God, this means, that deep within each one, there are unlimited capacities for goodness, gentleness, kindness, generosity, endurance, happiness, joy, peace, love and truth".

The Cuan Mhuire style of treatment is focused on tackling the two problems
The underlying issues that have created the addiction to an addictive substance.
The addiction to an addictive substance.
The addiction programme aims to identify the underlying causes of the addiction and to deal with the pain underneath these addictions.

Cuan Mhuire uses the following methods to achieve its goals.
Group Therapy
One-to-One Counselling
Meditation
Attendance at AA (Alcohol Anonymous), NA(Narcotics Anonymous), GA(Gamblers Anonymous) Meetings
Therapeutic Duties
Video lectures and discussions on all aspects of addiction and recovery
Family Day for relatives of persons in treatment
Aftercare for relatives of persons in recovery

Philosophy
Eternal value – Cuan Mhuire believes that each human being is of eternal value, is made to the image and likeness of God and that there are no hopeless cases.
Unconditional love – For addicts Cuan Mhuire aims to be A light in the darkness, a beacon of hope
Total abstinence – Cuan Mhuire's underlying objective for its treatment is: Total Abstinence
Self change- Cuan Mhuire describes itself as A Place Where I change Myself, Not Anybody else.

Guiding principles
Cuan Mhuire works to a number of guiding principles.
Emphasise the positive. Believing there is no value in the negative, guilt, remorse, poor self-image, and low self-esteem. These are things to be reduced or removed rather than boosted.
Responsibility is encouraged. Cuan Mhuire want to walk with people rather than do their walking for them.
Understanding where people are at, and where they are coming from. Many of Cuan Mhuire's staff who work with those currently suffering from addiction, have previously suffered similar experiences themselves.
Cuan Mhuire is a community to help, support its members. Cuan Mhuire considers that their community doesn't just include those who are in Cuan Mhuire but also draws in their families and carers.
Perseverance simply a refusal to give up on anyone.
Cuan Mhuire believes in the higher power offered to them by God and that Spirituality runs across and through Cuan Mhuire.

Recognition of work 
Sr. Consilio has been publicly honoured on many occasions. Sr. Consilio has accepted every award or nomination on behalf of Cuan Mhuire. The awards include:
1975 Nurse of the Year in recognition of her work and professionalism
1977 Received a civic reception by the Lord Mayor of Galway and nominated as one of the "People of the Year"
1993 Nominated for Dublin Lord Mayor Awards and was placed on Dublin's civic honours list. The Lord Mayor of Dublin at that time was Alderman Gay Mitchell, T.D.
1996 Kerry Person of the Year
1997 Athy Person of the Year
1999 Conferred with Honorary Life Membership of the Royal Dublin Society
1999 Winner of the Irish Sun "Sunshine Person of the Year"
1999 Hall of Fame Award sponsored by Allied Irish Bank and the Kerryman
2000 Sr. Consillio was conferred with an Honorary Fellowship of the Faculty of Nursing and Midwifery at the Royal College of Surgeons
2002 Conferred with Honorary Fellowship of the Waterford Institute of Technology (WIT).
2002 Degree of Doctor of Laws (LLG) conferred by The Higher Education and Training Awards Council
2003 Voted, by Radio Kerry listeners, "The Greatest Kerry Person of All Time"
2003 Awarded Duhallow Person of the Year.
2010 CHKS international quality improvement award for 2010.
2011 Sr. Consillio was awarded an honorary MBE in recognition of her lifelong work in helping individuals and families suffering from alcoholism and other addictions.

Locations

Since then Cuan Mhuire charity has increased in size dramatically going from one site in Athy to having locations all over the country. As of 2019 it has 5 full residential centres, 3 residential transition houses and 2 training centres. Cuan Mhuire has facilities in both north and south of Ireland.

Full residential centres
Cuan Mhuire, Cardenton, Athy, County Kildare.
Cuan Mhuire, Coolarne, Athenry, County Galway.
Cuan Mhuire, Bruree, County Limerick.
Cuan Mhuire, Newry, County Down, Northern Ireland.
Cuan Mhuire, Farnanes, County Cork. (women only)

Residential transition houses
Teach Mhuire, 38–39 Lower Gardiner Street, Dublin. (men)
Sancta Maria, Hamilton Street, Dublin. (women)
Teach Mhuire, 21 St. Helen's Street, Galway. (men)
Teach Mhuire, Roxboro Road, Limerick. (men)
Sancta Maria, North Circular Road, Limerick. (women)
Cuan Mhuire, Corfad, Ballybay, County Monaghan. (men)
Teach Mhuire, Western Road, Cork. (men)

Training
Cuan Mhuire, Ballycarron, Golden, County Tipperary, provides in-service training for Cuan Mhuire and other staff.
An accredited two-year Diploma in Counselling is offered from the Galilee House of Studies in Athy.

See also
 Addiction medicine
Alcoholism
 Drug addiction
 Catholicism
 Moderation Management
 European Monitoring Centre for Drugs and Drug Addiction
 Gambling addiction
 Substance dependence

References

External links
 Cuan Mhuire Web Site

Drug and alcohol rehabilitation centers
Charities based in the Republic of Ireland
Athy
Mental health organisations in Ireland